The Kaluga electoral district was a constituency created for the 1917 Russian Constituent Assembly election. The electoral district covered the Kaluga Governorate. The constituency was assigned 8 seats in the Constituent Assembly.

In Kaluga, the SR list was dominated by leftist elements.

In Kaluga town the Kadets emerged victorious with 6,857 votes (49.2%), followed by the Bolsheviks with 3,454 votes (24.7%), Mensheviks 2,321 votes (16.7%), SRs 772 votes (5.5%), Gromada 320 votes (2.3%), Old Believers 166 voters (1.2%) and Popular Socialists 54 votes (0.4%). In the town garrison, the Bolsheviks got the major share of votes (1,619 votes, 72.5%), followed by the Kadets 298 votes (13.3%), SRs 203 votes (9.1%), Mensheviks 86 votes (3.9%), Gromada 17 votes (0.7%) and 8 Popular Socialists (0.4%).

Results

References

Electoral districts of the Russian Constituent Assembly election, 1917